Scott Dibble may refer to:
Scott Dibble (singer-songwriter), Canadian singer-songwriter, recording artist and producer
Scott Dibble (politician) (born 1965), Minnesota politician
Scott Dibble (Home and Away)